Nguyễn Tuấn Mạnh (born 31 July 1990) is a Vietnamese footballer who plays as a goalkeeper for V.League 1 club SHB Đà Nẵng and Vietnam national football team

Honours 
Vietnam 
AFF Championship: 2018

Childhood 
Nguyễn Tuấn Mạnh  was born in Tinh Gia district, Thanh Hoa in a family with 2 brothers, Nguyen Trong Hung. His father was a volleyball player Nguyen Trong Chu, who was a famous setter in Thanh Hoa, then moved to Gia Lai to establish his career. In 1999, Nguyễn Tuấn Mạnh and his brother followed his mother to Gia Lai and lived with his father. In 2005, he joined the football talent team of Gia Lai province. After a period of training, in 2006 he was officially admitted to Hoang Anh Gia Lai.

Career

Club 

In 2005, after a period of training, Nguyễn Tuấn Mạnh was selected to the U-15 team of Hoang Anh Gia Lai.

He regularly participates in the youth team of Hoang Anh Gia Lai competing in domestic youth tournaments. In 2009, he and the U-19 team Hoang Anh Gia Lai reached the final of the National U-19 tournament in 2009. Although only receiving a silver medal, after losing to U-19 Viettel in a series of 11m shot in the final But it was a great success for only Nguyễn Tuấn Mạnh as well as his teammates.

In the final round of U-21 Bao Thanh Nien tournament in 2010, Nguyễn Tuấn Mạnh and U-21 team Hoang Anh Gia Lai won the bronze medal. After that, Nguyễn Tuấn Mạnh was called into the U-21 national team of Thanh Nien Newspaper to participate in the 2010 international Thanh Nien tournament.

Thanks to his achievements in the youth tournaments, Tuan Manh was noticed by the coaching team of the first team Hoang Anh Gia Lai club.

He was officially promoted by the club to the first team in the V-League 2010 season. Before that, Tuan Manh also had his first match for Hoang Anh Gia Lai in a 1 - 4 defeat against SHB Danang at Chi Lang Stadium. 2009 season. Being in the first team of a top club in Vietnam when he was less than 20 years old was a remarkable success in his career as a professional player. However, during the 2010 season, Tuan Manh had almost no chance to play, he was in the first team mainly to train his abilities under the guidance of Thai coach Kiatisuk Senamuang.

The opportunity to assert himself came to Nguyễn Tuấn Mạnh in the HAGL match against Vicem Hai Phong, in the 6th round of the 2011 season, on March 13, 2011. After entering the second half, Nguyễn Tuấn Mạnh played excellently. , denied many chances of the home team, helping HAGL gain 1 point. In the next match, Nguyễn Tuấn Mạnh was arrested, HAGL won 3-0 against Dong Tam Long An club. Nguyễn Tuấn Mạnh played prominently when he blocked many scoring opportunities from Antonio, Tshamala.

In the 2011 season, Nguyễn Tuấn Mạnh played all 13 matches for club HAGL.FROM ZERO.

Not letting go of the sadness of losing the SEA Games, since the reign of Korean coach Choi Yun-kyum (3 seasons 2012,2013,2014) he only caught a total of 13 matches and mainly served as a reserve for TM Bassey. Akpan is Nigerian. Indeed, the lack of competition seemed to have caused him to be forgotten by BHL ĐTVN and consequently he was not called into the 27th SEA Games in Myanmar ... At the beginning of the 2015 season, with almost all the U19s at HAGL Arsenal JMG On the first team, Bau Duc decided to purge almost the entire old team of HAGL to win the spot for young players.

In 2014 Hoang Anh Gia Lai replaced all team personnel, Nguyễn Tuấn Mạnh transferred to play for Sanna Khanh Hoa.

In 2020, Nguyễn Tuấn Mạnh actively said goodbye to Pho Bien and joined SHB Da Nang.

National recruitment 

After his impressive performance in the 2011 V-League, Nguyễn Tuấn Mạnh was summoned by coach Phan Thanh Hung to the list of Vietnamese Olympic teams to participate in the London 2012 Olympic qualifiers.

Nguyễn Tuấn Mạnh had his first match in the Olympic shirt colors in Vietnam on June 19, 2011.

It was the match of the Vietnamese Olympic team against the Arap Saudi Olympic team at Sultan bin Abdul-Aziz Al Saud. In that match, Nguyễn Tuấn Mạnh still kept his good form, blocking many shots of the team.

The second match, Nguyễn Tuấn Mạnh started in the Olympic colors of Vietnam on June 23, 2011 at My Dinh National Stadium.

These are the Olympic Games for the Olympic Arap Saudi, which is 1 - 4 for the Olympic London 2012.

On September 20, 2011, Nguyễn Tuấn Mạnh continued to participate in the U-23 Vietnam squad to participate in the Ho Chi Minh City Football Cup.

In this tournament, goalkeeper Nguyễn Tuấn Mạnh started two matches U-23 Vietnam lost to Korean students 0-1 and won U-23 Singapore 2 - 1. At the end of the tournament, U-23 Vietnam ranked in 3rd place.

In preparation for the 26th SEA Games in Indonesia, Nguyễn Tuấn Mạnh joined U-23 Vietnam at the VFF Cup, held at My Dinh National Stadium from October 19 to October 23.

He started two matches U-23 Viet Hoa 1 - 1 U-23 Uzbekistan and drew U-23 Malaysia with a score of 1 - 1.

SEA Games 26 in Indonesia is the first major international tournament in Nguyễn Tuấn Mạnh's career. In this tournament, U.23 Vietnam played unsuccessfully when only ranked 4th. Young goalkeeper Nguyễn Tuấn Mạnh was able to catch two important matches, the opening match in the group stage, U.23 Viet. Nam won the Philippines U.23 with a score of 3 - 1 and the third match, U.23 Vietnam lost to U.23 Myanmar 1 - 4.

Nguyễn Tuấn Mạnh has had a great promotion in his career.

Immediately after joining the Olympic team, he was highly appreciated by the Vietnamese coach, Mr. Falko Goetz. And the reward for Nguyễn Tuấn Mạnh is a place in the shirt of the Vietnam team played against Qatar in the second qualifying round of the 2014 World Cup. Unfortunately, Nguyễn Tuấn Mạnh has not had the opportunity to assert himself. Vietnam national Tel also broke up from that tournament after losing to Qatar with a total score of 2 - 4.

In the 2019 Asian Cup qualifying round, the sixth match of Nguyễn Tuấn Mạnh came to replace Van Lam in the match against Jordan. He had many excellent saves to preserve the 1-1 score for Vietnam.

Achievement

With club Hoang Anh Gia Lai 
Gold medal in Vietnam National U-19 Prize 2009, 
Bronze Medal of U-21 Prize of Thanh Nien 2010.

With Vietnam Team 
AFF Cup,
1 Champion (1): 2018.

References

1990 births
Living people
Vietnamese footballers
Vietnam international footballers
Hoang Anh Gia Lai FC players
SHB Da Nang FC players
V.League 1 players
People from Thanh Hóa province
Association football goalkeepers
2019 AFC Asian Cup players